Thorsteinsson and Thorsteinsen are patronymic surname of Scandinavian origin, meaning son of Thorsteinn. The names may refer to:

Thorsteinsson 

 Björn Thorsteinsson (born 1940), Icelandic chess master
 Raymond Thorsteinsson, Canadian geologist of the Arctic regions
 Steingrímur Thorsteinsson (1831–1913), Icelandic poet, author, and translator
 Thorbjorn Thorsteinsson (d. 1158), Orcadian (of Orkney) pirate

Thorsteinsen 

 Cecilie Thorsteinsen, Norwegian team handball player

Patronymic surnames